Thames Head is a group of seasonal springs that arise near the village of Coates in the Cotswolds, about three miles south-west of the town of Cirencester, in the county of Gloucestershire, England. The spring water comes from the limestone aquifers of the Cotswolds. One or more of these springs are traditionally identified as the source of the River Thames.

In actuality, the source of the River Thames does not have a fixed location – rather, it changes according to the level of the groundwater in the limestone. In dry periods, the groundwater level falls, causing the Thames Head springs to dry up and the river to begin lower down in its course. In wet conditions, the groundwaters rise and the river can begin at one of the Thames Head springs.

The highest springs of Thames Head are located north of the A433 road (Fosse Way section), in a meadow called Trewsbury Mead. The springs continue immediately south of the A433.

The Ordnance Survey identifies Thames Head as the source of the Thames on its maps and the UK's Environment Agency follows their precedent. However, there is also a long-standing alternative view that the real source of the Thames is on a different headstream entirely: at Seven Springs, Gloucestershire, the source of the River Churn, which is officially a tributary of the Thames that joins the Thames at Cricklade and which is longer than the course of the Thames from Thames Head to Cricklade.

Description 
Thames Head is a group of seasonal springs which, when flowing, form the headstream of the River Thames, the major river which runs through the South of England and the centre of London.

The field to the north of the A433, Trewsbury Mead, has the highest-located springs, which tend only to flow during a wet winter. One of these springs is marked with an inscribed stone marker. Below it, the springhead itself is in a hollow that has been lined with stones.

The actual start of the River Thames changes as the level of groundwater changes. The spring known as Lyd Well, located south of the A433 (grid reference ST989984), is often where the river starts.

Marker stone
The marker stone in Trewsbury Mead bears the inscription:

Thames source dispute 
The source of the River Thames is disputed. The Environment Agency, the Ordnance Survey and other authorities have the source of the Thames as Thames Head. Others hold that the true source of the Thames is at Seven Springs, Gloucestershire, some  farther north, and east of Gloucester. Seven Springs is officially the source of the River Churn, which is a tributary of the Thames that joins at Cricklade. As it is further from the mouth of the Thames than Thames Head, the adoption of Seven Springs as its source would make the Thames the longest river in the UK.

See also 
Winterbourne

References

Springs of England
SThamesHead